Loukas Stylianou (born July 5, 1984 in Nicosia, Cyprus) is a Cypriot football defender who currently plays for Chalkanoras Idaliou.

Stylianou played for Thrasyvoulos F.C. in the Greek Beta Ethniki during the 2006–07 season. In the summer of 2009 he signed in Anorthosis Famagusta and then for Digenis Morphou.

He has a twin brother, Demetris Stylianou who plays for Ermis Aradippou.

References

External links

1984 births
Living people
Sportspeople from Nicosia
Twin sportspeople
Cypriot twins
Association football defenders
Cypriot footballers
Cyprus international footballers
Olympiakos Nicosia players
Thrasyvoulos F.C. players
Omonia Aradippou players
Digenis Akritas Morphou FC players
Doxa Katokopias FC players
Anorthosis Famagusta F.C. players
PAEEK players
Chalkanoras Idaliou players
Cypriot expatriate footballers
Expatriate footballers in Greece